Zadní Kopanina is a cadastral district of Prague, Czech Republic. It is the least populated cadastral area of Prague, with 110 inhabitants as of 31 December 2021.

References

Districts of Prague